Niihau School of Kekaha (NSK), also known as Ke Kula Niihau O Kekaha Learning Center (KKNOK), is a K-12 charter school in Kekaha, Kauai, Hawaii, United States, catering to Niihau people living on Kauai.

According to Christine Hitt of Hawai'i Magazine, the school is trying to keep the Niihau language alive due to a growing Niihau diaspora in Kauai, where the dominant languages are instead English and Hawaiian Pidgin.

History
On May 17, 2001, the Hawaii State Board of Education approved the creation of the charter school. The state classifies it as a " K-12 New Century Public Charter School".

Demographics
In 2016, there were 54 students, with about 50% being native speakers of Niihau Hawaiian, and with all 54 students being from Niihau. Many of the students are members of the same families. 95% of the students were native Niihau speakers in 2004.

In 2017, there were three teachers for preschool and two other teachers.

Curriculum
Secondary courses are taught in English and elementary courses are taught in the Niihau language.

References

External links
 Ke Kula Niihau O Kekaha Learning Center
 Ke Kula Ni'ihau O Kekaha Learning Center - Hawaii Public Charter School Commission

Charter K-12 schools in the United States
Public K-12 schools in Hawaii
Public schools in Kauai County, Hawaii
Public high schools in Kauai County, Hawaii